Bern Brünnen Westside railway station is a railway station in the municipality of Bern, in the Swiss canton of Bern. It is an intermediate stop on the standard gauge Bern–Neuchâtel line of BLS AG.

Services 
 the following services stop at Bern Brünnen Westside:

 Bern S-Bahn:
 : half-hourly service to Bern.

References

External links 
 
 

Railway stations in the canton of Bern
BLS railway stations
Buildings and structures in Bern